...Only a Suggestion is the debut studio album by the stoner rock band Hermano.  It was released by Tee Pee Records with a sampler of other bands such as High on Fire and Black NASA.

Track listing

Disc One

Disc Two - Tee Pee Records Spring 2002 Sampler

Personnel
John Garcia – vocals
David Angstrom – guitar
Mike Callahan – guitar
Steve Earle – drums
Dandy Brown – bass, organ, piano

Notes
 The album was reissued in 2007 under the Suburban Records label.

References

Hermano (band) albums
2002 debut albums
Tee Pee Records albums